The 1938–39 Ohio Bobcats men's basketball team represented Ohio University. Dutch Trautwein was the head coach in his first year for Ohio. The Bobcats played their home games at the Men's Gymnasium.  They finished the season 12–8 and 4–4 in the Buckeye Athletic Association.  This was Ohio's last year in the BAA as it dissolved.

Schedule

|-
!colspan=9 style=| Regular Season

Source:>

References

Ohio Bobcats men's basketball seasons
Ohio
Ohio Bobcats
Ohio Bobcats